The 1916-17 season in Swedish football, starting August 1916 and ending December 1917:

Honours

Official titles

Competitions

Promotions, relegations and qualifications

Promotions

Relegations

Domestic results

Svenska Serien 1916–17

Uppsvenska Serien 1916–17

Mellansvenska Serien 1916–17

Östsvenska Serien 1916–17

Västsvenska Serien 1916–17

Svenska Mästerskapet 1916 
Final

Svenska Mästerskapet 1917 
Final

Kamratmästerskapen 1916 
Final

Kamratmästerskapen 1917 
Final

Wicanderska Välgörenhetsskölden 1916 
Final

National team results 

 Sweden: 

 Sweden: 

 Sweden: 

 Sweden: 

 Sweden: 

 Sweden: 

 Sweden:

National team players in season 1916/17

Notes

References 
Print

Online

 
Seasons in Swedish football